Rock Cliff Farm, also known as the B.W. Wells Farm, is a historic farm and national historic district located near Wake Forest, Wake County, North Carolina. The property is owned by the Federal government, and part of a large acreage managed by the State of North Carolina as the Falls Lake State Recreation Area.  Contributing resources include the Grounds of Rock Cliff Farm, Ray-Wells House (c. 1895, c. 1954), meathouse (c. 1885-1890), Lowery-Ray Cemetery (1901), studio (1954, c. 1955-1960), lumber storage rack (c. 1954-1955), Ray House (c. 1900-1920), and Ray House Outbuilding (c. 1900-1920). Rock Cliff Farm was the retirement residence of Dr. Bertram Whittier Wells (1884-1978), a noted American botanist and ecologist active.

The district was listed on the National Register of Historic Places in 2007.

References

Farms on the National Register of Historic Places in North Carolina
Historic districts on the National Register of Historic Places in North Carolina
Houses completed in 1895
Buildings and structures in Wake County, North Carolina
National Register of Historic Places in Wake County, North Carolina